CANFLEX; the name is derived from its function: CANDU FLEXible fuelling, is an advanced fuel bundle design developed by Atomic Energy of Canada Ltd. (AECL), along with the Korean Atomic Energy Research Institute (KAERI) for use in CANDU design nuclear reactors. The designers claim that it will deliver many benefits to current and future CANDU reactors-using natural uranium or other advanced nuclear fuel cycles. These include greater operating and safety margins, extended plant life, better economics and increased power.

The CANFLEX bundle has 43 fuel elements, with two element sizes. It is about 10 cm (four inches) in diameter, 0.5 m (20 inches) long and weighs about 20 kg (44 lbs) and  replaces 37-pin standard bundle. It has been designed specifically to increase fuel performance by utilizing two different pin diameters. This reduces the power rating of the hottest pins in the bundles, for the same total bundle power output. Also, the design incorporates special geometry modifications that enhance the heat transfer between the fuel and surrounding coolant.  Twenty-four of these fuel bundles have been tested in the Point Lepreau CANDU 6 reactor in New Brunswick, Canada, and results indicate CANFLEX meets all expectations and regulatory requirements.

The Bruce Nuclear Generating Station has announced a conversion to CANFLEX fuel for their reactors, in 2006.

See also
 Nuclear fuel
 Nuclear fuel cycle
 Uranium market
 Reprocessed uranium
 Global Nuclear Energy Partnership

References
 Development of CANFLEX-NU Fuel as a CANDU Advanced Fuel

Nuclear materials
Nuclear reprocessing
Nuclear technology in Canada